Blaan, also known as Bilaan, is an Austronesian language of the southern Philippines.

Classification
Blaan belongs to the Bilic microgroup of the Philippine language subgroup, along with Giangan Manobo, Tiruray, and Tboli.

Distribution
There are two major varieties of Blaan: Koronadal Blaan (Tagalagad) and Sarangani Blaan (Tumanao).

According to the Ethnologue, Koronadal Blaan is spoken in:
eastern South Cotabato Province
Sarangani Province
Sultan Kudarat Province (Lutayan area)
Davao Occidental Province

Sarangani Blaan is spoken in:
almost the entire area of Sarangani Province
South Cotabato Province (General Santos and north)
Davao Occidental Province (language area across from Sarangani Province's northern border)

Phonology
Blaan has fifteen consonant and seven vowel phonemes. Unlike most other Philippine languages and Austronesian languages in general, Blaan (as its related language Tboli, permits a variety of consonant clusters at the onset of a syllable. This is evident in the name of the language, . This contraction of the original schwa sound exists in other Austronesian languages (such as Javanese, a major language of Java in Indonesia), but is rarely seen outside of the Bilic group within the Philippines.

Syntax
Blaan uses word order to indicate the thematic roles of nominal elements in the sentence.

Similar to other Philippine-type Austronesian languages, Blaan uses verbal morphology to indicate voice (or focus, as it is usually called in the literature). Here are some examples of voice/focus types in Blaan:

Agent voice/focus (-m-)

Patient voice/focus (-n-)

Vocabulary

References

Languages of South Cotabato
Languages of Sarangani
Languages of Davao Occidental
South Mindanao languages